Shark Tank India is an Indian Hindi-language business reality television series that airs on Sony Entertainment Television. The show is the Indian franchise of the American show Shark Tank. It shows entrepreneurs making business presentations to a panel of investors or sharks, who decide whether to invest in their company.

Shark Tank India (season 1) aired on Sony LIV and Sony Entertainment Television from 20 December 2021 to 4 February 2022. 

Shark Tank India (season 2) aired on Sony LIV and Sony Entertainment Television from 2 January 2023 to 10 March 2023. The second season featured Amit Jain, CEO & Co-founder of CarDekho group, InsuranceDekho.com as a New Shark.  Rahul Dua was the host of the season.

Concept
The show features a panel of potential investors, termed as "Sharks", who listen to entrepreneurs' pitch ideas for a business or product they wish to develop.  These self-made multi-millionaires judge the business concepts and products pitched and then decide whether to invest their money to help market and mentor each contestant. The host of the show was Rannvijay Singha for the first season and was replaced by Comedian Rahul Dua for second season.

Series overview

Timeline of sharks

See also 
 Shark Tank
 The Vault (TV series)
 Dragons' Den (British TV programme)

References

External links
 
 Shark Tank India  on Sony LIV

Sony Entertainment Television original programming
Shark Tank